Jacques Jean Marie Rogge, Count Rogge (2 May 1942 – 29 August 2021) was a Belgian sports administrator and physician who served as the eighth President of the International Olympic Committee (IOC) from 2001 to 2013. In 2013, Rogge became the IOC's Honorary President, a lifetime position, which he held until his death in 2021.

Life and career
Rogge was born in Ghent, Belgium, during the Nazi Germany occupation. He was the son of Suzanne and Charles Rogge, an engineer. Rogge was by profession an orthopedic surgeon and was educated at the Jesuit private school Sint-Barbaracollege and the University of Ghent.

Rogge was a noted athlete in his home country. He was a 16-time Belgian national champion in rugby and a one-time yachting world champion. He also competed in the Finn class of sailing on three Summer Olympic Games; in 1968, 1972, and 1976. In October 2016, The British School of Brussels named their new Sports Centre in his honour.

Rogge served as president of the Belgian Olympic Committee from 1989 to 1992, and as president of the European Olympic Committees from 1989 to 2001. He became a member of the IOC in 1991 and joined its executive board in 1998. He was knighted in 1992, and in 2002 made a count in the Belgian nobility by King Albert II. When Rogge stepped down as President of the IOC he was awarded by his successor a gold Olympic Order. On 25 February 2014, The Princess Royal appointed him as an Honorary Knight Commander of the Order of St Michael and St George (KCMG) at Buckingham Palace for his years of service to the Olympics and in particular for his work on the London 2012 Olympic Games.

On 28 April 2014, Rogge was appointed Special Envoy for Youth Refugees and Sport by United Nations Secretary-General Ban Ki-moon, to help promote sport as an empowerment tool for youth from displaced and refugee communities towards peace, reconciliation, security, health, education, gender equality, and a more inclusive society.

In his free time, Rogge was known to admire modern art and was an avid reader of historical and scientific literature.

On 14 October 2016, The British School of Brussels opened its new sports center in Tervuren, Belgium. The building was opened and named after Rogge, titled "The Jacques Rogge Sports Centre".

In 2017 the International Paralympic Committee awarded Rogge its highest honour the Paralympic Order for saving them from financial disaster. Rogge received the International Fair Play Committee's lifetime achievement award, the Jean Borotra World Fair Play Trophy. The committee decided to name their youth award in honour of Rogge, calling it the Jacques Rogge Fair Play Trophy for The Youth.

Rogge died on 29 August 2021, at the age of 79. The IOC did not say what the cause of death was, but Rogge had been suffering from Parkinson's disease.

President of the IOC

Rogge was elected as President of the IOC on 16 July 2001 at the 112th IOC Session in Moscow as the successor to Juan Antonio Samaranch, who had previously led the IOC since 1980.

At the 2002 Winter Olympics in Salt Lake City, Rogge became the first ever IOC President to stay in the Olympic village, thereby enjoying closer contact with the athletes.

In October 2009 he was re-elected for a new term as President of the IOC. In September 2013 at the 125th IOC Session in Buenos Aires, German Thomas Bach (who had won a gold medal in fencing at the 1976 Summer Olympics in Montreal) was elected as his successor.

In 2011, a Forbes magazine list of the 68 most powerful people in the world listed Rogge at no. 67.

On 27 July 2011, one year prior to London 2012, Rogge attended a ceremony at Trafalgar Square where he invited athletes worldwide to compete in the forthcoming Olympic Games. Former Olympians the Princess Royal and Sebastian Coe unveiled the medals up for grabs, after both Prime Minister David Cameron and London Mayor Boris Johnson had given speeches.

In December 2011, Rogge was invested as an Officer of the Légion d'honneur by French President Nicolas Sarkozy.

Jacques Rogge's IOC Presidency came to an end at the 125th IOC Session in Buenos Aires. German Thomas Bach was elected as the new IOC President at the session on 10 September 2013. Rogge was then made Lifetime Honorary President of the IOC, a position which he held until his death in 2021.

Controversies
PRC internet censorship
For the 2008 Summer Olympics in Beijing, People's Republic of China, Rogge pronounced in mid-July 2008 that there would be no Internet censorship by PRC government authorities: "for the first time, foreign media will be able to report freely and publish their work freely in China". However, by 30 July 2008, IOC spokesman Kevan Gosper had to retract this optimistic statement, admitting that the Internet would indeed be censored for journalists. Gosper, who said he had not heard about this, suggested that high IOC officials (probably including the Dutch Hein Verbruggen and IOC Director of the Olympic Games, Gilbert Felli, and most likely with Rogge's knowledge) had made a secret deal with PRC officials to allow the censorship, without the knowledge of either the press or most members of the IOC. Rogge later denied that any such meeting had taken place, but failed to insist that the PRC adhere to its prior assurances that the Internet would not be censored.

The play Dear Mr. Rogge, written by Dinah Lee Küng in 2012, depicts an imprisoned PRC dissident who wrote a letter challenging Rogge to walk from the Birds Nest stadium to Beijing Prison No. 2 in order to check the truth of Rogge's claim that hosting the Olympics would serve as a catalyst only for good in the country.

Criticism of Bolt's jubilation
Rogge commented that Usain Bolt's gestures of jubilation and excitement after winning the 100 meters in Beijing are "not the way we perceive being a champion," and also said "that he should show more respect for his competitors." In response to his comments, Yahoo! Sports columnist, Dan Wetzel, who covered the Games, described him as "a classic stiff-collared bureaucrat," and further contended that "[the IOC] has made billions off athletes such as Bolt for years, yet he has to find someone to pick on". In an interview with Irish Times reporter Ian O'Riordan, Rogge clarified, "Maybe there was a little bit of a misunderstanding.... What he does before or after the race I have no problem with. I just thought that his gesticulation during the race was maybe a little disrespectful".

Munich Massacre moment of silence
Rogge rejected calls for a minute of silence to be held to honor the 11 Israeli Olympians killed 40 years prior in the Munich massacre, during the opening ceremonies of the 2012 Summer Olympics. He did this despite the standing request of the families of the 11 Israeli Olympic team members and political pressure from the United States, Britain, and Germany, stating: "We feel that the opening ceremony is an atmosphere that is not fit to remember such a tragic incident." Speaking of the decision, Israeli Olympian Shaul Ladany, who had survived the Munich massacre, commented: "I do not understand. I do not understand, and I do not accept it." Rogge and the IOC instead opted for a ceremony at Guildhall, London, on 6 August, and one at Fürstenfeldbruck Air Base on the anniversary of the attack, 5 September.

Honours and titles

Rogge received these honours and titles in Belgium and abroad for his work:
 1992: Creation of Knight Rogge, by Royal decree of King Baudouin
 2002: Creation of Count Rogge, by Royal decree of King Albert II
 2011: Member of the Order of Friendship
 2011: Officer of the Legion of Honour, by President Sarkozy
 2013: Grand Cross of the Order of the Crown (Belgium), by Royal decree of 19 September 2013
 2014: Honorary Knight Commander in the Order of St. Michael and St. George (UK), 2014
 2012: Knight Commander in the Order of Orange-Nassau, by Royal decree of Queen Beatrix
 2015: Knight Grand Cross in the Order of Adolphe of Nassau.
 Knight Grand Cross in the Order of Merit of the Italian Republic
 Order of Merit of Ukraine
 Order of Prince Yaroslav the Wise
 Decoration of Honour for Services to the Republic of Austria
 Order for Merits to Lithuania
 2013: Olympic Order
 2013: Honorary President of the International Olympic Committee
 2017''': Paralympic Order

Academic degrees
Rogge received several honorary degrees (honoris causa'') :
 Baku State University, Azerbaijan
 Semmelweis University, Hungary
 École Polytechnique Fédérale de Lausanne, Switzerland
 Józef Piłsudski University of Physical Education in Warsaw, Poland
 University of Southern Denmark
 Lithuanian Sports University
 Ghent University, Belgium in 2001
 Taras Shevchenko National University of Kyiv, Ukraine, in October 2006
 Beijing Sport University, China, on 24 October 2006
 Galileo University, Guatemala, on 30 June 2007
 University of Porto, Portugal, in November 2009
 National Sports Academy of Bulgaria, in January 2009
 University of Oradea, Romania, in September 2010
 Royal Military Academy (Belgium) on 28 October 2010
 KU Leuven, Belgium in 2012
 National University of Ukraine on Physical Education and Sport, in May 2018

References

External links
 
 
 
 

1942 births
2021 deaths
Belgian rugby union players
Belgian sportsmen
Belgian orthopaedic surgeons
Belgian male sailors (sport)
Counts of Belgium
Ghent University alumni
International Olympic Committee members
Recipients of the Legion of Honour
Olympic sailors of Belgium
Honorary Knights Commander of the Order of St Michael and St George
Sailors at the 1968 Summer Olympics – Finn
Sailors at the 1972 Summer Olympics – Finn
Sailors at the 1976 Summer Olympics – Finn
Sportspeople from Ghent
Presidents of the International Olympic Committee
People in sports awarded knighthoods
Honorary Officers of the Order of the Star of Ghana
Recipients of the Order of the Companions of O. R. Tambo
Recipients of the Paralympic Order
Recipients of the Olympic Order
Recipients of the Order of Prince Yaroslav the Wise, 3rd class
Recipients of the Order of Merit (Ukraine), 1st class